Ross Corner is an unincorporated community and census-designated place (CDP) located in Frankford Township, in Sussex County, New Jersey, United States. As of the 2010 United States Census, the CDP's population was 13.

Geography
According to the United States Census Bureau, Ross Corner had a total area of 0.495 square miles (1.281 km2), including 0.492 square miles (1.274 km2) of land and 0.003 square miles (0.007 km2) of water (0.55%).

Demographics

Census 2010

References

Census-designated places in Sussex County, New Jersey
Frankford Township, New Jersey